Jean-Paul Defrang (born 22 June 1956) is a Luxembourgian football player. He is now retired from playing.

International career
He was a member of the Luxembourg national football team from 1983 to 1984.

External links

1956 births
Living people
Luxembourgian footballers
Luxembourg international footballers
Jeunesse Esch players
FC Progrès Niederkorn players
Association football goalkeepers